John Strachan (died 1810) was an Anglican clergyman who served in the Scottish Episcopal Church as the Bishop of Brechin from 1788 to 1810.

Biography 
He was consecrated the Coadjutor Bishop of the Diocese of Brechin at Peterhead on 26 September 1787 by Primus Kilgour and bishops Keith and Macfarlane. He succeeded as the Diocesan Bishop of Brechin in 1788. He died in office in 1810.

References 

 
  

1810 deaths
18th-century Scottish Episcopalian bishops
19th-century Scottish Episcopalian bishops
Bishops of Brechin (Episcopalian)
Year of birth unknown